Cheruvathur railway station (Code: CHRV) is a railway station in Kasaragod District, Kerala and falls under the Palakkad railway division of the Southern Railway zone, Indian Railways.

Important trains originating from Cheruvathur railway station

The following trains starting or ending at Cheruvathur railway station:

References

Palakkad railway division
Railway stations in Kasaragod district
Cheruvathur area